Klaudia Naziębło (born 3 December 1993) is a Polish swimmer. She competed in the women's 200 metre butterfly event at the 2017 World Aquatics Championships.

References

External links
 

1993 births
Living people
Place of birth missing (living people)
Swimmers at the 2010 Summer Youth Olympics
Polish female butterfly swimmers
20th-century Polish women
21st-century Polish women
Competitors at the 2022 World Games
World Games gold medalists